Ochlodes yuma, the Yuma skipper, is a species of grass skipper in the butterfly family Hesperiidae.

The MONA or Hodges number for Ochlodes yuma is 4057.

Subspecies
These five subspecies belong to the species Ochlodes yuma:
 Ochlodes yuma anasazi S. Cary & Stanford, 1995
 Ochlodes yuma lutea Austin in T. Emmel, 1998
 Ochlodes yuma sacramentorum Austin in T. Emmel, 1998
 Ochlodes yuma scudderi (Skinner, 1899)
 Ochlodes yuma yuma (W. H. Edwards, 1873)

References

Further reading

 

Ochlodes
Articles created by Qbugbot